Hubby may refer to:

Slang
 Hubcap
 Husband

People
 Harry P. Gamble (1904–1995), American multi-sport college athlete nicknamed "Hubby"
 Hubby Jenkins, American musician
 J. L. Hubby (1932–1996), American geneticist and pioneer of gel electrophoresis
 Chubby Hubby, blogger Aun Koh (born 1972) from Singapore

See also
 Huby (disambiguation)
 "Hubbie", nickname of Husband E. Kimmel (1882–1968), US Navy admiral and commander-in-chief of the United States Pacific Fleet during the Japanese attack on Pearl Harbor
 "Hubbie", nickname of Archie Turner (musician) (born 1946), American keyboard player and songwriter